Daniel Korbel is a Canadian bridge player.

Sister: Rebekah Korbel

Bridge accomplishments

Wins
 North American Bridge Championships  (3)
Mitchell Board-a-Match Teams (1) 2015 
 2016 Jacoby Swiss Teams
 Grand National Teams (1) 2019 (Championship Flight)
 Canadian National Teams Championships (CNTC) (4) 
2009, 2011, 2012, 2014

Runners-up
 2012 transnational world championship
 North American Bridge Championships (4)
 Roth Open Swiss Teams (1) 2014 
 Wernher Open Pairs (1) 2007 
 Mitchell Board-a-Match Teams (1) 2016
 2017 Vanderbilt KO Teams(runner up)

Notes

External links
 

Canadian contract bridge players